Dingwu (1646–1664) was the era name of the Dingwu Emperor of the Southern Ming and was used for a total of 18 years.

This era name comes from Cha Jizuo's (查繼佐) Zui wei lu Han zhu ji (罪惟錄·韓主紀), and the beginning and ending years of Meng Sen's (孟森) research are from 1646 to 1663. It was generally considered unreliable.

Change of era
 1646 (Longwu 2): The Prince of Han changed the era to Dingwu 1 (定武元年, "the first year of the Dingwu era").

Comparison table

Other regime era names that existed during the same period
 China
 Shunzhi (順治, 1644–1661): Qing dynasty — era name of the Shunzhi Emperor
 Kangxi (康熙, 1662–1722): Qing dynasty — era name of the Kangxi Emperor
 Dashun (大順, 1644–1646): Xi dynasty — era name of Zhang Xianzhong
 Longwu (隆武, 1645–1646): Southern Ming — era name of the Longwu Emperor
 Shaowu (紹武; Did not inaugurate): Southern Ming — era name of the Shaowu Emperor
 Yongli (永曆, 1647–1683): Southern Ming — era name of the Yongli Emperor
 Dongwu (東武, 1648): Southern Ming — era name of Zhu Changqing, Prince of Huai
 Jianguo Lu (監國魯, 1646–1653): Southern Ming — era name of Zhu Yihai, Prince of Lu
 Zhongxing (中興, 1647): Qing period — era name of the Jiang Erxun (蔣爾恂)
 Tianzheng (天正, 1648): Qing period — era name of Zhang Jintang (張近堂) in Dongming
 Tianshun (天順, 1661): Qing period — era name of Xiao Weitang (蕭惟堂)
 Vietnam
 Phúc Thái (福泰, 1643–1649): Later Lê dynasty — era name of Lê Chân Tông
 Khánh Đức (慶德, 1649–1653): Later Lê dynasty — era name of Lê Thần Tông
 Thịnh Đức (盛德, 1653–1658): Later Lê dynasty — era name of Lê Thần Tông
 Vĩnh Thọ (永壽, 1658–1662): Later Lê dynasty — era name of Lê Thần Tông
 Vạn Khánh (萬慶, 1662): Later Lê dynasty — era name of Lê Thần Tông
 Cảnh Trị (景治, 1663–1671): Later Lê dynasty — era name of Lê Huyền Tông
 Thuận Đức (順德, 1638–1677): Mạc dynasty — era name of Mạc Kính Vũ
 Japan
 Shōhō (正保, 1644–1648): era name of Emperor Go-Kōmyō
 Keian (慶安, 1648–1652): era name of Emperor Go-Kōmyō
 Jōō (承応, 1652–1655): era name of Emperor Go-Kōmyō and Emperor Go-Sai
 Meireki (明暦, 1655–1658): era name of Emperor Go-Sai
 Manji (万治, 1658–1661): era name of Emperor Go-Sai
 Kanbun (寛文, 1661–1673): era name of Emperor Go-Sai and Emperor Reigen

See also
 List of Chinese era names
 List of Ming dynasty era names

References

External links
《后明韩主续考》

Southern Ming eras